Renáta Medgyesová (born 28 January 1983 in Komárno) is a former Slovak athlete, competing in the long jump,  triple jump and  high jump.

Achievements

References
 

1983 births
Living people
Slovak female high jumpers
Slovak female long jumpers
Slovak female triple jumpers
Sportspeople from Komárno